Nephrolepis brownii, the Asian sword fern, is a species of fern native to Asia and introduced elsewhere.

Range

The native range includes most of southeast Asia and extends north to China and Japan, west to Sri Lanka and India, east to Pacific islands, and south to Australia. It is introduced in North and South America and Hawaii.

References

brownii